Diken is a town and a nagar panchayat in Neemuch district in the state of Madhya Pradesh, India.

Demographics

 India census, Diken had a population of 7,206. Males constitute 51% of the population and females 49%. Diken has an average literacy rate of 57%, lower than the national average of 59.5%: male literacy is 72% and, female literacy is 40%. In Diken, 15% of the population is under 6 years of age.

Specialty
Diken has a large solar panel plant area, which is the largest in Madhya Pradesh.

Transport

References

Cities and towns in Neemuch district
Neemuch